Anne Müller (born 5 July 1983) is a Retired German handball player, who last played for Borussia Dortmund Handball, until 2019.

She won a bronze medal with the German national team at the 2007 World Women's Handball Championship.

She participated at the 2008 Summer Olympics in China, where the German team placed 11th.

References

External links

1983 births
Living people
German female handball players
Handball players at the 2008 Summer Olympics
Olympic handball players of Germany